Sue O'Connor is an Australian archaeologist and Distinguished Professor in the School of Culture, History & Language at the Australian National University.  Her research focuses primarily on the evidence of Pleistocene settlement and early human migration in the Indo-Pacific region.

Education
O'Connor studied archaeology at the University of New England (Australia) and graduated with honors in 1980. She furthered her studies at the 
University of Western Australia where she received her PhD in 1991.

Career
O'Connor was a  lecturer at the University of Western Australia (UWA) from 1991 to 1994. In 1994, she accepted a research fellowship at Australian National University (ANU) in the Department of Archaeology and Natural History. In 2005, she was promoted to the Head of the Department and in 2008 was made a full Professor.

O'Connor has conducted archaeological projects in the Northern Territory of Australia, Kimberley (Western Australia) Indonesia, Papua New Guinea and Timor Leste. Her research findings have demonstrated the first evidence of ancient people living in  the Kimberley region over 40,000 years ago. Her investigations have also resulted in the earliest indication for rock art production in Australia

Important archaeological discoveries

East Timor Cave
O'Connor led a research expedition which discovered a cave site in East Timor, with evidence of people living more than 42,000 years ago. It is "the oldest evidence of occupation by modern humans on the islands that were the stepping stones from South-East Asia to Australia". Prior to O'Connor's research, scholars believed that early humans migrated south from Maritime Southeast Asia to Australia by traveling northwards by means of Borneo and Sulawesi, and then south through Papua New Guinea. With the new research findings, O'Connor believes that early humans traveled south from Maritime Southeast Asia  through East Timor to Australia.

Canine domestication in East Timor

O'Connor worked on a team that conducted research on a dog burial found at Matja Kuru in East Timor. Their findings suggest that humans domesticated dogs at the site as early as 3,000 years ago. Analysis of the remains revealed a number of morphological similarities between modern-day domesticated dogs and the dog found at the burial site. O'Connor and her team assert that the presence of domesticated dogs may indicate that a hunting-foraging way of life was still prevalent at the time.

Pleistocene era burial
In 2017,  O'Connor's research team recovered the world's oldest fish hooks from an ancient burial site on Alor Island, Indonesia. Five circular, rotating hooks, probably used for deep-sea fishing, were found under the chin and around the jaws of an adult female skeleton buried 12,000 years ago. This discovery contradicts the current theory that most fishing activities on the island had been carried out by men. Until 2017, the oldest fish-hooks found with a burial site
were unearthed at a river site in Siberia and were determined to be 9,000 years old.

Selected publications

Journals

Books

Awards
1999–2003 Australian Research Council QEII Fellowship
2007 elected Fellow, Australian Academy of the Humanities (FAHA)
2011 Rhys Jones Medal for Outstanding Contribution to Australian Archaeology

2012 Australian Research Council Laureate Fellowship 
2018 ANU Vice-Chancellor's Award for Excellence in Research

References 

Australian women archaeologists
Australian anthropologists
Australian women anthropologists
University of New England (Australia) alumni
Australian National University alumni
Living people
20th-century archaeologists
21st-century archaeologists
21st-century Australian women writers
20th-century Australian women writers
Year of birth missing (living people)